The cycling competitions at the 2009 Mediterranean Games took place from 30 June to 3 July at the Pescara urban circuit.

Athletes competed in three events.

Medal summary

Medalists

Medal table

External links
2009 Mediterranean Games Website

Sports at the 2009 Mediterranean Games
2009
2009 in road cycling